The WNBA Commissioner's Cup, known for sponsorship reasons as the WNBA Commissioner's Cup Presented By Coinbase, is an in-season competition of the Women's National Basketball Association that begins at the start of the regular season and continues throughout the first half of the season. The final is played between the top teams from the Eastern Conference and the Western Conference. A total of 60 regular-season contests involving all 12 teams count toward the Cup standings.

The Commissioner's Cup was originally scheduled to begin in the 2020 WNBA season, but due to the COVID-19 pandemic, the Cup was first awarded in the 2021 season.

In October 2021, the WNBA announced that Coinbase had acquired the naming rights to the Cup starting with the 2022 tournament.

Format
The Commissioner's Cup consists of regular-season games, 10 games per team, designated to count toward Cup play. The team from each conference with the top record in designated “Cup games” will then compete for the Commissioner's Cup title and a special prize pool. Cup games are the first home game and first road game each team plays against its five conference rivals. The Cup brings back the Eastern–Western Conference rivalry that WNBA used in its playoff tournament until the 2015 WNBA Playoffs.

The first Commissioner's Cup Final game was held at the Footprint Center in Phoenix, Arizona.

Prize
The total compensation tops out at $500,000, with the winning team making around $30,000 per player and the game's MVP taking home an additional $5,000. On the losing team's side, players will earn $10,000 each.

The winning team would also receive the Commissioner's Cup Trophy.

History

Final appearances
Statistics below refer solely to wins and losses in the final, not to Commissioner's Cup qualifying games.

Cup final records
This table shows a list of records through the history of the Commissioner's Cup final.

See also

References

External links
WNBA.com

Recurring sporting events established in 2020
 
Women's basketball cup competitions